Mohammed Tukur Liman was elected Senator for the Katsina South constituency of Katsina State, Nigeria at the start of the Nigerian Fourth Republic, running on the People's Democratic Party (PDP) platform. He took office on 29 May 1999.

After taking his seat in the Senate in June 1999, Liman was appointed to committees on Banking & Currency, Communication (vice chairman), Education and Special Projects.
He was appointed Senate Majority Leader. As head of a committee set up to review government revenue flows and budget implementation, in August 2002 he made an interim report that indicated the need for further probes. Some Senate members considered that non-implementation of the budget could be cause for impeachment of President Olusegun Obasanjo.

References

Living people
Peoples Democratic Party members of the Senate (Nigeria)
Education ministers of Nigeria
20th-century Nigerian politicians
21st-century Nigerian politicians
Katsina State politicians
Year of birth missing (living people)